VA-72 has the following meanings:
VA-72 (U.S. Navy)
State Route 72 (Virginia)